A metallic roller bearing is a base isolation device which is intended for protection of various building and non-building structures against potentially damaging lateral impacts of strong earthquakes.

This bearing support may be adapted, with certain precautions, as a seismic isolator to skyscrapers and buildings on soft ground. Metallic roller bearings are employed by a housing complex (17 stories) in Tokyo, Japan.

See also

 Earthquake-resistant structures
 Elevated building foundation

References

Earthquake engineering
Seismic vibration control